Eviless (also sometimes Saturna) is a fictional character appearing in DC Comics publications and related media, commonly as a recurring adversary of the superhero Wonder Woman. A slave driver from the planet Saturn, she had several Golden Age clashes with Wonder Woman before founding the first incarnation of Villainy Inc., a team of supervillains composed of several of Wonder Woman's foes, including the Cheetah, Doctor Poison, Giganta and Queen Clea.

Fictional character biography

Pre-Crisis

Eviless was introduced in Wonder Woman #10 (1944), but not formally by name until issue #28.

A slave driver from Saturn (later retconned as a subatomic earthlike world near or within Saturn), Eviless and Duke Mephisto Saturno (of the Saturnian Invasion Force) battled Wonder Woman. Although defeated by Wonder Woman, she later returned after being taken to Transformation Island. She pretended to die by controlling her heartbeat and stole the Golden Lasso. She placed a splinter in the lock of the Venus Girdle, meaning it did not affect her, though she pretended she had reformed. After taking control of a guard using the lasso, she freed several prisoners from Transformation Island (criminals previously captured by Wonder Woman) and banded them together as Villainy Inc. The team was unsuccessful against Wonder Woman, despite kidnapping her mother, and were defeated and captured.

Post-Crisis
Post-Crisis, Villainy Inc. was led by Queen Clea and the existence of Eviless has not yet been revealed, even in Post-Infinite Crisis continuity.

DC Rebirth
After the events of DC Rebirth, Eviless' history was altered. She took the name Saturna and became the leader of the Crimson Men, a doomsday cult. She possessed necromantic abilities, such as forming black wings on her body or controlling the dead. Saturna battled Steve Trevor and his team while investigating a mystical island inhabited by children. Steve Trevor defeated Saturna twice, the second of which left her deep within a chasm, covered with rocks. However, drops of the island's magical water fell into Saturna's unconscious mouth, implying her possible return.

Powers and abilities
Eviless does not appear to have any superpowers, but skillfully uses a whip to control her subjects. At times, she has appeared to put herself into a deathlike trance at will by stopping her heart.

Post-Rebirth, Saturna has an array of magical necrotic abilities.

See also
 List of Wonder Woman enemies

References

 AmazonArchives.com
The Unofficial Zara Biography
 
 Jett, Brett. "Who Is Wonder Woman?--Bonus PDF"", (2009): "Major Villains", 1–17.
 Marston, William Moulton. Emotions Of Normal People. London: Kegan Paul, Trench, Trübner & Co, Ltd. 1928. 
 Valcour, Francinne.  "Training "love leaders": William Moulton Marston, Wonder Woman and the "new woman" of the 1940s", (Dissertation) (1999): 1–150.

Comics characters introduced in 1944
DC Comics aliens
DC Comics extraterrestrial supervillains
DC Comics female supervillains
DC Comics characters who use magic
Fiction set on Saturn
Golden Age supervillains
Wonder Woman characters
Slavery in fiction
Fictional characters from the Solar System
Fictional necromancers
Fictional slave owners
Fictional whip users
Characters created by William Moulton Marston
Characters created by H. G. Peter